This was the first edition of the tournament.

Martin Kližan won the title after defeating Darian King 6–3, 6–3 in the final.

Seeds

Draw

Finals

Top half

Bottom half

References
Main Draw
Qualifying Draw

Oracle Challenger Series - Indian Wells - Men's Singles